Maelstrom may refer to:

 Maelstrom (whirlpool), a powerful whirlpool
 originally the Moskstraumen in English

Amusement rides 
 Maelstrom (ride), a former log flume dark ride attraction in the Epcot theme park at Walt Disney World Resort in Florida
 Maelstrom, a spinning flat thrill ride at Morey's Piers in Wildwood, New Jersey
 Maelstrom, a gyro swing ride at Drayton Manor Theme Park, Staffordshire, UK

Characters 
 Maelstrom (comics), fictional character that appears in comic books published by Marvel Comics
 Maelstrom, a character from Ice Age
 Mael Strom, aka Yuki Yoshida, from the anime/manga Is This a Zombie?
 Professor Maelstrom, a fictional villain in the 2019 Netflix series Carmen Sandiego
 Maelstrom, also known as Wazir Kale, a character from Hitman 2

Film and television 
 Maelström (film), a 2000 Canadian film
 Maelstrom (TV series), a 1985 BBC television drama serial
 "Maelstrom" (Battlestar Galactica)

Games 
 Maelstrom (1992 video game), an Apple Macintosh game
 Maelstrom (role playing game), a role-playing game by Alexander Scott
 Maelstrom (video game), a 2007 PC game
 VOR: The Maelstrom, a miniature wargame
 Maelstrom (Live Action Roleplaying), a live action roleplaying game run 2004–2012 by Profound Decisions
 Maelstrom, a lightning-based hammer item in the video game "Dota 2"

Literature 
A Descent into the Maelström, an 1841 short story by Edgar Allan Poe
Maelstrom (Timms novel), a novel by E.V. Timms
 Maelstrom, a 2001 novel by Peter Watts
 Maelstrom, a 2006 novel in the Petaybee Series by Anne McCaffrey and Elizabeth Ann Scarborough
 Maelstrom (Destroyermen novel), the third book of the Destroyermen series

Music 
 Maelstrom, an album by JR Ewing
 Mælstrøm , an album by the Belgian crust punk band Oathbreaker
 "Maelstrom," a song by The Steve Miller Band on the album Living in the 20th Century
 "Maelstrom," a composition by Julian Cochran
 "The Maelstrom," a composition by Robert W. Smith
 "Maelstrom 2010," a song by the Canadian melodic death metal band Kataklysm on the album Temple of Knowledge
 Maelstrom, a Boston-based thrash metal band active from the late 1980s to the early 1990s that released an LP on Taang! Records